Siglin Rocks is a cluster of rock outcrops midway between Schneider Rock and Binder Rocks on the west side of Martin Peninsula, Bakutis Coast, Marie Byrd Land. First photographed from the air by U.S. Navy Operation Highjump in January 1947. Named by Advisory Committee on Antarctic Names (US-ACAN) after Chief Warrant Officer D.F. Siglin, U.S. Navy, maintenance coordinator at the Williams Field air strip, McMurdo Sound, during Deep Freeze 1967.

Rock formations of Marie Byrd Land